Intrusos en el espectáculo is an Argentine chat show hosted by Jorge Rial from 2001 to 2020, Adrián Pallares and Rodrigo Lussich from 2021 to 2022, and is currently hosted by Florencia de la V. It has been aired by América TV since 2001.

Staff

Hosts 
Jorge Rial (2001-2020)
Adrián Pallares (2021-2022)
Rodrigo Lussich (2021-2022)
Florencia de la V (2022–present)

Guest hosts
Luis Ventura (2001-2014, 2022)
Beto Casella (2003)
Marcelo Polino (2014-2020)
Adrián Pallares (2014-2021)
Rodrigo Lussich (2015)
Mariano Iúdica (2017)
Moria Casan (2018)
Alejandro Fantino (2022)
Marcela Tauro (2022)

Argentine television talk shows
América TV original programming
2001 Argentine television series debuts